Morena Clara is a Venezuelan telenovela created by Ligia Lezama and produced by Venevisión in 1993. The series was distributed internationally by Venevisión International.

Astrid Carolina Herrera and Luis José Santander starred as the main protagonists with Alejandro Martínez, Gabriela Spanic and Henry Galue as the main antagonists.

Plot
Clara Rosa is the illegitimate daughter of a wealthy landowner in Santa Barbara del Zulia and a peasant named Rosalinda who was presumed dead from drowning in the river. Emiliano her father refused to recognize Clara Rosa as his child, and she grows up into a beautiful woman full of illusions. Her bitter and poor aunt Vinceta raised her up in the slums of Caracas together with her two sons. Due to their poor situation, Clara Rosa is forced to earn a living as a street peddler though she dreams of having a better life for herself. Meanwhile, Clara's father has become an important political figure, though his personal life is in shambles after his wife Montserrat leaves him for his political enemy Lisandro. Lisandro and his wife Eugenia have raised up his dead brother's sons as his own: Valentin and Francisco. Valentin meets Linda Prado who tricks him into marriage by getting pregnant. Clara Rosa and Valentin will meet after an uprising occurs in the city.

Cast
Astrid Carolina Herrera as Clara Rosa Guzman/Clara Rosa Andara
Luis Jose Santander as Valentin Andara
Alejandro Martínez as Andino
Gabriela Spanic as Linda Prado 
Carolina Cristancho as Jennifer Andara
Julio Alcázar as Emiliano Andara
Luly Bossa as  Magdalena Vallán
Miguel Alcantara as Dr. Vanoni
Henry Galué as Lissandro Prado

Yajaira Orta as Montserrat Prado
Simón Pestana as Armando
Yuri Rodriguez as Tomas
Carolina Lopez as Maria Luisa Vanoni
Marisela Buitriago as Laura
José Guerrero
Isabel Herrera
Isabel Hungría

References

External links
 Morena Clara at the Internet Movie Database

1994 telenovelas
Venevisión telenovelas
Venezuelan telenovelas
1994 Venezuelan television series debuts
1994 Venezuelan television series endings
Spanish-language telenovelas
Television shows set in Venezuela